The ribbon snake (Thamnophis saurita) is a common species of garter snake native to Eastern North America. It is a non-venomous species of snake in the subfamily Natricinae of the family Colubridae. The ribbon snake averages  in total length (including tail). It is dark brown with bright yellow stripes. The ribbon snake is not sexually dimorphic; however, females are normally thicker than their male counterparts.

The ribbon snake can be found in wet climates such as lakes, streams, ponds and marshes. The ribbon snake is active from April to October and hibernates during the winter months. Maturity is reached around 3 years of age.

Subspecies
The following four subspecies of ribbon snake are recognized as being valid:

Eastern ribbon snake – T. s. saurita  – brown body with three distinctive stripes, typically yellow, one down the middle of the back and one down each side, that alternate with the brown body. Ranges from New York to Florida, west to the Mississippi River.
Northern ribbon snake – T. s. septentrionalis  – dark brown/black with yellow line down its back and often its sides; ranges from Maine through Ontario and Indiana.
Southern ribbon snake or peninsula ribbon snake – T. s. sackenii  – tan or brown; ranges from South Carolina south through Florida.
Bluestripe ribbon snake – T. s. nitae  – dark with light blue lateral stripes; Gulf Coast of north-central Florida.

Nota bene: A trinomial authority in parentheses indicates that the subspecies was originally described in a genus other than Thamnophis.

Habitat
Ribbon snakes are typically found in aquatic and high-vegetation. Since they hunt for ectothermic animals, they tend to live in areas that are mainly water, making it easier for them to swim and catch their prey. Although most of them live in aquatic areas, they also tend to reside in forests or higher rocky areas.

Prey and predators 
In order to hunt, ribbon snakes use a few of their senses including auditory and visual perception. Ribbon snakes do not eat warm-blooded prey, just as garter snakes, also of the genus Thamnophis, do not. Using their auditory and visual traits, they are able to prey upon newts, salamanders, frogs, toads, tadpoles, small fish, spiders, and earthworms. Meanwhile, they fall prey to mammals, birds, and larger amphibians and reptiles. Ribbon snakes rarely use any aggressive form of defense. Instead, they use their brown bodies to camouflage with the surrounding vegetation. Along with this, they flee and hide in dense patches of grass in which they will coil up and get as low to the ground as possible. Given that snakes consume their prey whole, small individuals are particularly constrained in the size and shape of prey that can be consumed. These smaller snakes compensate for their smaller body size by having larger heads.

Reproduction 
Beginning in the spring, after hibernation, ribbon snakes begin to look for another snake with which to mate. Ribbon snakes are ovoviviparous snakes, meaning they give birth to live young. The live young tend to be born in the summer, in litters of 4 to 27 snakes. Ribbon snakes tend to mature after two to three years, which is when they will be able to start breeding. Ribbon snakes tend to breed once or twice each year after they mature.

References

Further reading
 Conant, Roger; Bridges, William (1939). What Snake Is That? A Field Guide to Snakes of the United States East of the Rocky Mountains. (With 108 drawings by Edmond Malnate). New York and London: D. Appleton-Century Company. Frontispiece map + 163 pp. + Plates A–C, 1–32. (Thamnophis sauritus, pp. 121–124 + Plate 23, figures 68, 69B).
 Linnaeus C (1766). Systema naturæ per regna tria naturæ, secundum classes, ordines, genera, species, cum characteribus, differentiis, synonymis, locis. Tomus I. Editio Duodecima, Reformata. Stockholm: L. Salvius. 532 pp. (Coluber saurita, new species, p. 385). (in Latin).
 Powell R, Conant R, Collins JT (2016). Peterson Field Guide to Reptiles and Amphibians of Eastern and Central North America, Fourth Edition. Boston and New York: Houghton Mifflin Harcourt. 494 pp., 47 plates, 207 figures. . (Thamnophis sauritus, pp. 430–431 + Plate 43).
 Schmidt KP, Davis DD (1941). Field Book of Snakes of the United States and Canada. New York: G.P. Putnam's Sons. 365 pp., 34 plates, 103 figures. (Thamnophis sauritus, pp. 255–257 + Plate 28).
Smith HM, Brodie ED Jr (1982). Reptiles of North America: A Guide to Field Identification. New York: Golden Press. 240 pp.  (paperback),  (hardcover). (Thamnophis sauritus, pp. 144-145).
 Wright AH, Wright AA (1957). Handbook of Snakes of the United States and Canada. Ithaca and London: Comstock Publishing Associates, a Division of Cornell University Press. 1,105 pp., 306 figures, 70 maps. (in 2 volumes). (Thamnophis sauritus, pp. 824–828, 831–834, Figures 239, 241 + Map 59 on p. 767). 
 Zim HS, Smith HM (1956). Reptiles and Amphibians: A Guide to Familiar American Species: A Golden Nature Guide. New York: Simon and Schuster. 160 pp. (Thamnophis sauritus, pp. 105, 156).

External links
Ribbon Snake (Thamnophis sauritus) eating frog

Reptiles described in 1766
Reptiles of Canada
Reptiles of the United States
Snakes of North America
Taxa named by Carl Linnaeus
Thamnophis